= New York State Women Veterans Memorial =

Memorial in Madison Avenue, New York

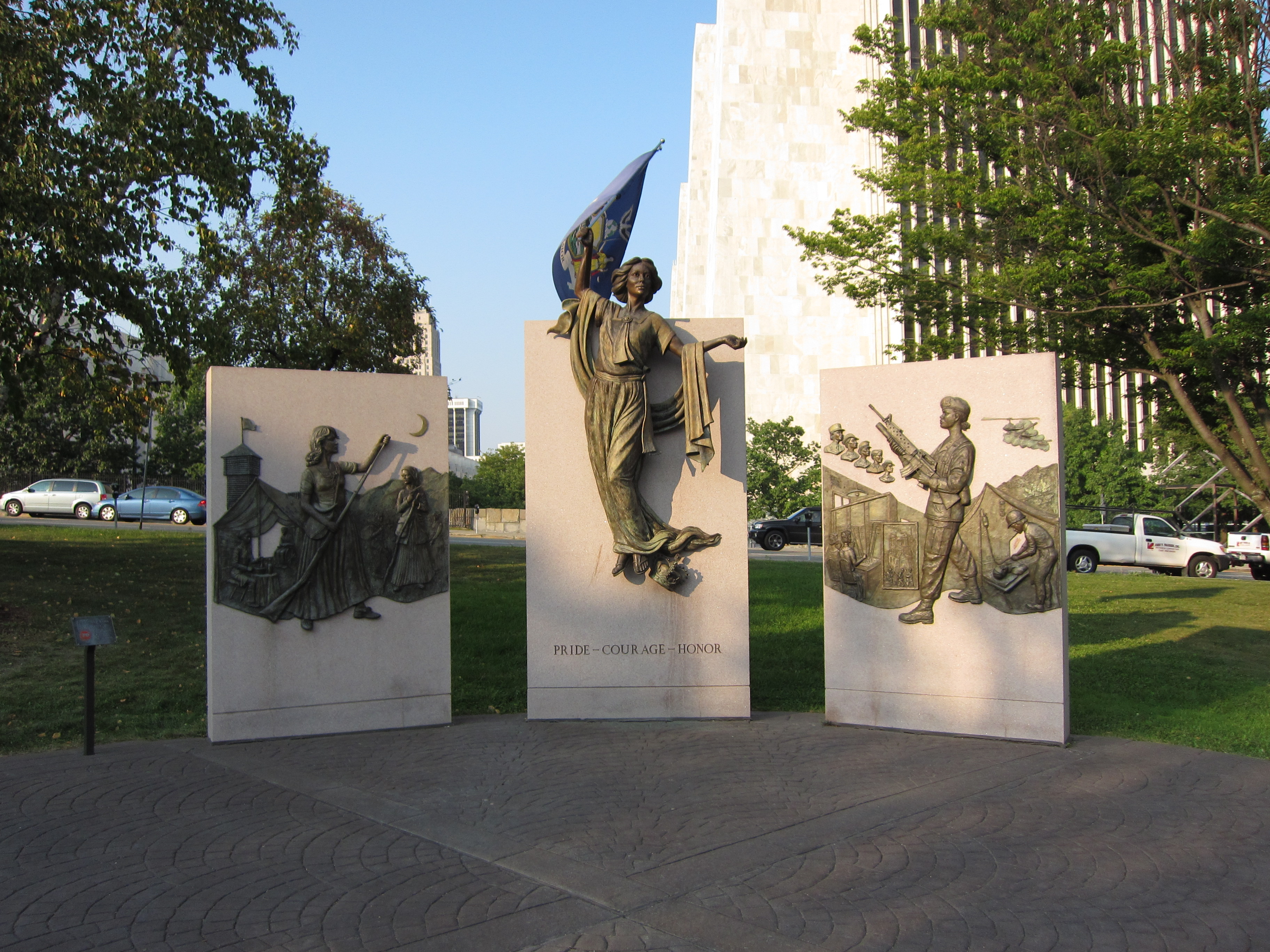
- Artist: Hy Rosen
- Year: 1998
- Type: bronze and granite
- Location: Albany, New York, United States of America; 42°38′57″N 73°45′46″W

The New York State Women Veterans Memorial is located on Madison Avenue in Albany, New York. It commemorates the role of women in military service.

The ground-breaking ceremony for the memorial was held in June 1998 and presided over by Governor George Pataki; the memorial was unveiled in December of the same year.

The memorial comprises three panels, each with a bronze bas-relief sculpture. The central panel features Liberty on the crown of England, holding the state flag aloft in her right hand. The other two panels show images of women veterans from various eras. The text on the memorial reads "Dedicated to the Women of New York State for their War Time Military Service in the Defense of this Nation".
